Tetrapropyltin is an organotin compound with the formula . It is a toxic colorless oily liquid. It reacts with strong oxidizing agents. This chemical irritates skin, eyes and respiratory system. It is very toxic to aquatic life with long-lasting effects. It can be absorbed through the skin, causing toxic effects to the body. Tetrapropyltin is an intermediate in the synthesis of dipropyltin dichloride.

References 

Organotin compounds